Lithuanian Americans refers to American citizens and residents who are Lithuanian and were born in Lithuania, or are of Lithuanian descent. New Philadelphia, Pennsylvania has the largest percentage of Lithuanian Americans (20.8%) in the United States. Lithuanian Americans form by far the largest group within the Lithuanian diaspora.

History
It is believed that Lithuanian emigration to the United States began in the 17th century when Alexander Curtius arrived in New Amsterdam (present day New York City) in 1659 and became the first Latin School teacher-administrator; he was also a physician.

After the fall of the Polish–Lithuanian Commonwealth in 1795, most of Lithuania was incorporated into the Russian Empire. The beginnings of industrialization and commercial agriculture based on Stolypin's reforms, as well as the abolition of serfdom in 1861, freed the peasants and turned them into migrant-laborers. The pressures of industrialization, Lithuanian press ban, general discontent, suppression of religious freedom and poverty drove numerous Lithuanians, especially after the famine in 1867–1868, to emigrate from the Russian Empire to the United States continuing until the outbreak of the First World War. The emigration continued despite the Tsarist attempts to control the border and prevent such a drastic loss of population. Since Lithuania as a country did not exist at the time, the people who arrived to the U.S. were recorded as either Polish, German or Russian; moreover, due to the language ban in Lithuania and prevalence of Polish language at that time, their Lithuanian names were not transcribed in the same way as they would be today. As a result, information about Lithuanian immigration before 1899 is not available because incoming Lithuanians were not registered as Lithuanians. Only after 1918, when Lithuania established its independence, the immigrants to the U.S. started being recorded as Lithuanians. This first wave of Lithuanian immigrants to the United States ceased when the U.S. Congress passed the Emergency Quota Act in 1921, followed by the Immigration Act of 1924. The Immigration Act of 1924 was aimed at restricting the Eastern Europeans and Southern Europeans who had begun to enter the country in large numbers beginning in the 1890s.

A second wave of Lithuanians emigrated to the United States as a result of the events surrounding World War II – the Soviet occupation of Lithuania in 1940 and the Nazi occupation that followed in 1941. After the war's end and the subsequent reoccupation of Lithuania by the Soviet Union, these Displaced Persons were allowed to immigrate from DP camps in Germany to the United States and to apply for American citizenship thanks to a special act of Congress which bypassed the quota system that was still in place until 1967. The Displaced Persons Act of 1948 ultimately led to the immigration of approximately 36,000 Lithuanians. Before that, the nationality quota was only 384 Lithuanians per year.

Lithuanian Americans today were still a relatively small ethnic group in 1990, since there were 842,209 Lithuanian Americans according to the U.S. Census; of these, 30,344 were foreign-born and 811,865 were born in the United States. This number was up from the 1980 figure of 742,776. The five states with the largest populations of Lithuanian Americans in both 1980 and 1990 (in descending order) were Illinois, Pennsylvania, New York, Massachusetts, and California.

Immigration of Lithuanians into the U.S. resumed after Lithuania regained its independence after the dissolution of the Soviet Union in 1990. This wave of immigration has tapered off recently with tougher U.S. immigration requirements and the entry of Lithuania into the EU have made countries such as Ireland and the United Kingdom a more accessible option for potential Lithuanian emigrants.

Lithuanian Days in Pennsylvania is the longest-running ethnic festival in the United States.

Occupations
At the end of the 19th century Lithuanians differed from most immigrant groups in the United States in several ways. They moved to the U.S. not only to escape poverty, but also to avoid bitter religious, political and national persecution, and compulsory military service in the Russian army. They did not plan to remain permanently and become "Americanized." Instead their intent was to live in the U.S. temporarily to earn money, invest in property, and wait for the right opportunity to return to Lithuania. Official estimates were that 30% of the emigrants from the Russian provinces of Poland–Lithuania returned home. When adjusted to include only non-Jews the number is closer to 50-60%. Lithuanian immigrants who mostly moved to the United States from Imperial Russia lived in a social environment akin to early European feudal society, where classless Jews performed the essential middle roles of artisans, merchants and moneylenders.

American employers considered Lithuanian immigrants, like the Poles, as better suited for arduous manual labor in coal-mines, slaughterhouses, and steel mills, particularly in the primary stages of steel manufacture. Consequently, Lithuanian migrants were recruited for work in the coal mines of Pennsylvania and the heavy industries (steel mills, iron foundries, slaughterhouses, oil and sugar refineries) of the Northeastern United States as well the Great Lakes cities of Chicago, Pittsburgh, Detroit, Buffalo, Milwaukee, and Cleveland. In Illinois, the state with the largest population of Lithuanian-Americans, "first-wave immigrants" also established communities of significance in Rockford and the coal-mining communities of Westville, Springfield (Auburn, Virden, Benld), East St. Louis, plus West Frankfort and Ledford in far Southern Illinois. One of the victims of the famous Herrin, Illinois, strike-breaking massacre was a coal-miner named Casper from Chicago, likely a Lithuanian immigrant.

So-called "second-wave" emigration after World War II was very different from the previous wave. The people who went to the U.S. were escaping in order to avoid the Soviet deportations to Siberian forced labor camps that were directed at certain social groups considered "enemies of the state" Many of these people constituted political, economical, and intellectual elite of the pre-war Lithuania and therefore were ultimately more qualified to find better jobs in the U.S. after U.S.-based education/training often obtained in night school while working factory jobs. Consequently, although some remained limited to factory jobs in Detroit or Chicago, many Lithuanians pursued careers in engineering, medicine, or education. Due to relentless oppression of Catholic clergy and religious orders by Soviet authorities, some clergy in predominantly Catholic Lithuania also moved to America.

Contributions

Many famous people in the United States are or have been aware of their Lithuanian ancestry, including famous movie director Robert Zemeckis, actors Ruta Lee, Blackie Dammett, John C. Reilly, Charles Bronson, Brendon Small, Jason Sudeikis, rock stars Anthony Kiedis, Brandon Flowers, and Thalia Zedek, model Jurgita Valts, notorious criminal Alvin Karpis, radio host Tom Leykis, scientist Marija Gimbutas, antiques dealer Israel Sack, reality television personality Aras Baskauskas, and Bishop Louis Vezelis, OFM. Current Senate Minority Whip Dick Durbin is half-Lithuanian. Noted Catholic Archbishop Paul Marcinkus, who held a post at the Vatican for a while, was an American whose father was Lithuanian. Famous skateboarder Natas Kaupas, one of the innovators of street skating in the late 1980s and early 1990s, is of Lithuanian heritage. Others, such as Robert Downey Jr.,William Shatner, Emma Goldman, John Milius, J. D. Salinger, Leo Penn, Sean Penn, Chris Penn, Michael Penn, Don Rickles, Moe Howard, Curly Howard, Shemp Howard and Pink, had their Jewish ancestors come from Lithuanian lands. Author Ruta Sepetys, an American of Lithuanian descent, traveled to Lithuania and interviewed people and then wrote an award-winning book, Between Shades of Gray, related to the hardships of Lithuanians during Soviet occupation of their land.

Many American sport celebrities have Lithuanian heritage such as Eleanor Dapkus, Johnny Unitas, Vitas Gerulaitis, Frank Lubin, Dick Butkus, Dan Audick, Joe Jurevicius, Jack Sharkey, Johnny Podres, Mariel Zagunis, Rose Namajunas, Joe Arlauckas, Rick Barry, Feliksas Kriaučiūnas and James Laurinaitis and others. Lithuanian Americans have also distinguished themselves in the arts such as stained glass artist and painter Adolfas Valeška as well as modern artists such as Jonas Mekas, the avant-garde filmmaker and George Maciunas, founder of the Fluxus movement.

Several fictional characters of Lithuanian birth who immigrated to the United States have prominently captured the American imagination. One is Jurgis Rudkus, a Lithuanian immigrant around whom Upton Sinclair's 1906 novel The Jungle chronicles the life of the Lithuanian community in Chicago and the treatment of workers in the Chicago Stockyards. The second, Hannibal Lecter, the villain of The Silence of the Lambs and Hannibal, was born in Lithuania but later moved to the United States and took U.S. citizenship. Marko Ramius, the Soviet submarine captain in The Hunt for Red October, is also described as "Lithuanian by birth" and as the "Vilnius Schoolmaster".

Distribution

Chicago has the largest Lithuanian community in the United States and with approximately 100,000 self-identified ethnic Lithuanians has the largest population of Lithuanians of any municipality outside Lithuania itself. The old "Lithuanian Downtown" in Bridgeport was once the center of Lithuanian political activity for the whole United States. Another large Lithuanian community can be found in the Coal Region of northeastern Pennsylvania, particularly in Schuylkill County where the small borough of New Philadelphia has the largest per capita percentage of Lithuanian Americans (20.8%) in the United States. There is also a large community of Lithuanian descent in the coal mining regions of Western Pennsylvania, northern West Virginia Panhandle and Northeastern Ohio tri-state area. Grand County, Colorado's Lithuanian-American community has the unusual distinction in that it is the only sizable immigrant population in an otherwise fairly homogeneous population in a rural, mountainous community. There is also a small but vibrant Lithuanian community in Presque Isle, Maine. Many Lithuanian refugees settled in Southern California after World War II; they constitute a community in Los Angeles. The majority of the Lithuanian community resides around the St. Casimir Lithuanian church in Los Feliz, in so-called "Little Lithuania.

The states with the largest Lithuanian-American populations are:
 Illinois – 87,294
 Pennsylvania – 78,330
 California – 51,406
 Massachusetts – 51,054
 New York – 49,083

Lithuanian-born population
Lithuanian-born population in the U.S. since 2010:

See also

 Lithuania–United States relations
 Destination Lithuanian America
 American Lithuanian Cultural Archives
 European Americans
 Hyphenated American
 Lithuanians in the Chicago area
 Our Lady of Vilnius Church

References

Further reading

 Fainhauz, David. Lithuanians in the U.S.: Aspects of Ethnic Identity (Chicago: Lithuanian Library Press, Inc., 1991).
 Gedmintas, Aleksandras. “Lithuanians.” In American Immigrant Cultures: Builders of a Nation, Vol. 2, edited by David Levinson and Melvin Ember, (Macmillan, 19970 pp 588–96..
 Granquist, Mark A. "Lithuanian Americans." in Gale Encyclopedia of Multicultural America, edited by Thomas Riggs, (3rd ed., vol. 3, Gale, 2014), pp. 111–127. Online
 Grazulis, Marius K. Lithuanians in Michigan ((Michigan State University Press, 2009).
 Kuzmickaitė, Daiva Kristina. Between Two Worlds: Recent Lithuanian Immigrants in Chicago (1998–2000). (Vilnius: Versus Aureus, 2003).

 Ališauskas, Arūnas. "Lithuanians" in Thernstrom, Stephan; Orlov, Ann; Handlin, Oscar, eds. Harvard Encyclopedia of American Ethnic Groups. Harvard University Press, (1980) available to borrow online

External links
  Lithuanian American Cultural Archives
 "Baltics in Boston" (Archive). WGBH-TV. August 22, 1989.
Lithuanian Music Hall Association (Philadelphia)

 
European-American society
American
American